Mary Shelley's Frankenhole is an American adult stop-motion animated television series created by Dino Stamatopoulos. The series premiered on June 27, 2010 on Cartoon Network's late night programming block Adult Swim. It ended on March 25, 2012, with a total of 20 episodes, over the course of 2 seasons.

Premise
Dr. Victor Frankenstein has completely mastered immortality and has now also created an infinite number of Einstein–Rosen Bridges (wormholes) or "Frankenholes" between Somewhere in Eastern Europe (which is teeming with monsters and supernatural forces) and every time period from the past and the future. This allows historical figures and celebrities seeking the doctor's services to find him. Although many classic horror monsters are present, the series' main focus is Dr. Frankenstein and his family. Creator Dino Stamatopoulos says "regular human beings are the monsters."

Besides Dr. Frankenstein himself, other characters from Mary Shelley's 1818 novel Frankenstein; or, The Modern Prometheus appear.

Characters
 Dr. Victor Frankenstein (voiced by Jeff B. Davis) – An immortal genius mad scientist. He "doesn't like anyone," wears a lab coat and has red hair. He is a sadomasochist (auto eroticism such as burning his crotch, shooting himself below the waist, etc.) and is opposed to the idea of regular sex, especially with his wife, who uses his fetish to her advantage by bribing him with genital mutilation. He had a troubled relationship with his father since his dying wish was to not be brought back to life. He begins work at midnight for "creditability." Since he never gave the immortality serum to his sons, they continue to age while Victor and Elizabeth stay youthful.
 Professor Sanguinaire Polidori (voiced by Scott Adsit) – The immortal assistant and partner of Victor. He is tall, has white hair and wears a lab coat. He sometimes acts as a conscience for Frankenstein, but is often quiet (playing into his supporting cast role). Often a voice of reason, "Polly Dolly" (as Frankenstein calls him) has a soft spot for the sinister. He insists they revive Frankenstein's father so they can beat him up, drinks poison, and often has a disdainful tone in his voice. Polidori has been Frankenstein's assistant for quite some time; he was already immortal when Frankenstein and Elizabeth were first married (in fact, Polidori was the one who married them). When bringing patients into Frankenstein's lab, it is said that he gives Frankenstein creepy introductions. He is based on Doctor Septimus Pretorius from Bride of Frankenstein. His name is based upon author John Polidori, a friend of Mary Shelley.
 Elizabeth Frankenstein (voiced by Britta Phillips) – Victor's immortal wife. She tries to act motherly but is sexually starved and is having an affair with Count Dracula, although she does this to try to make Victor jealous. She is often at odds with her husband and lover, often expressing displeasure over the little time Victor devotes to the family due to working from midnight forward. Victor secretly gave Elizabeth the immortality serum without her knowing about it when she married Victor's childhood friend Henry Clerval, and never asked to be immortal. When she did finally give into his obsessive demands to marry her, he instantly became bored. This is the reason for their faulted relationship. Her demands to have more children are ironically stymied by Victor's endeavours to create life.
 Count Dracula (voiced by Chris Shearer) – Victor's rival who is having an affair with Elizabeth, with hopes of turning her into a vampire. He often argues with Victor, usually belittling Elizabeth in the process. He is known to be politically correct during his arguments with Frankenstein. Dracula usually exits a scene turning into a bat.
 Frankenstein's "Creature" (voiced by Scott Adsit) – Victor's cynical creation and servant, who prefers to be called Creation instead of Monster. He is an alcoholic according to Victor, expressing his life and future are death, and has a big fear of fire. He at one point mentions that Frankenstein was fearful of his creation, but now has come to be annoyed by the monster.  His left leg is Jewish, and can speak when detached. He is also very much infatuated with "The Bride", who was made for him. However, she has a true disdain for him, going so far as to have her hair replaced with fire to keep him away.
 Igor (voiced by Tigger Stamatopoulos) – Victor's hunch-backed assistant with a girlish, childish voice who usually briefly supplies tools during Victor's projects. Igor usually responds to his orders with "You got it".
 Blanket Jackson (voiced by Mark Rivers) – Michael Jackson's adult son, who recently bought ownership of the tavern where all the local monsters hang out.
 Heinrich Frankenstain and Gustav Frankenstain (voiced by Mark Rivers and Scott Adsit) – The elderly, mortal sons of Victor and Elizabeth. Victor doesn't care much about them but despite this, Elizabeth tries to be motherly. In some ways, she cares more about them than Victor does. When Heinrich has been shown in his youth, he was full of joy. In his youth, it was the only time even Victor and Polidori found him adorable. But most likely over the years, both quickly grew bored of the children. Though Heinrich remains a happy child at heart, Gustav has become bitter about his mortality and hates his parents for not making him immortal, often cursing at them in German under his breath. The Grim Reaper doesn't take their lives because he wants to punish Victor and Elizabeth by letting them live (the two may have gained immortality because of Death's bitter qualities). Victor tried to murder them; however, Death refuses to take their lives even when Victor slit their throats. They are named after Heinrich Gustav Magnus, a scientist.
 Stewart Lawrence (voiced by Jay Johnston) – A suicidal man with the curse of the Werewolf as the result of a time paradox of ironically biting himself while in his transformed state. He can only be killed at the hands of someone who loves him. He's an annoyance to almost everyone as he's constantly complaining about his curse.
 Joe Yunger (voiced by Joe Unger) – A local vampire hunter who often hangs out at the tavern. Because of their mutual hatred of vampires, he and Victor have become good friends.
 The Mummy (voiced by Dino Stamatopoulos) – A wannabe comedian mummy who constantly annoys everyone with his bad jokes and one mummy pun (of being "all wrapped up") which he shoehorns into routines.
 Dr. Jekyll and Mr. Hyde (voiced by Dan Harmon) – The local pharmacist and Victor's rival mad-scientist. Victor regards Jekyll's serum as idiotic as "no-one wants to become their own monster".
 Mohandas K. Gandhi (voiced by Mark Rivers) – One of the local vampires, he speaks with a stereotypical Italian accent and uses stereotypical Italian phrases and expressions. He begins a relationship with the Creation's "Bride".
 Mother Teresa (voiced by Dino Stamatopoulos) – The Frankensteins' servant.
 Vampire Trio - A group of vampires that usually show up together.  
 Nosferatu – A silent vampire who is often seen hanging out at the local tavern. He speaks in silent film title cards. He is a parody of Count Orlok from 1922's Nosferatu, and pastiche versions of Sesame Street's Count von Count and Count Chocula of breakfast cereal fame.
 Death (Dino Stamatopoulos) – The physical manifestation of Death. He goes out of his way to try and bother the immortal Dr. Frankenstein. Death takes joy out of his powers and duty, but is seen as a goof ball by anyone not subject to his power. He really just wants Dr. Frankenstein's respect. His design is inspired by Death as it appears in The Masque of the Red Death.

Episodes

Season 1 (2010)
Episodes in the first season were requested to air out of order by the series creator, Dino Stamatopolous, following the show's theme that all time takes place at once and is meaningless.

Season 2 (2012)
Season two episodes are titled in commemoration of famous writers and poets of classic science fiction.

International broadcast 
In Canada, Mary Shelley's Frankenhole previously aired on G4's Adult Digital Distraction block.

Home media
Every episode, with the exception of "Mother To Be-Sa", is available for digital purchase on iTunes, Google Play, Amazon Video and Microsoft.

The show is available to stream for free on Tubi.

References

External links
 
 

2010 American television series debuts
2012 American television series endings
2010s American adult animated television series
2010s American black comedy television series
2010s American comic science fiction television series
2010s American horror comedy television series
American adult animated horror television series
American adult animated comedy television series
American adult animated science fiction television series
American comic science fiction television series
American stop-motion adult animated television series
American time travel television series
English-language television shows
Adult Swim original programming
Cultural depictions of Mahatma Gandhi
Cultural depictions of Mother Teresa
Cultural depictions of Adolf Hitler
Cultural depictions of Thomas Jefferson
Cultural depictions of Lyndon B. Johnson
Cultural depictions of Michael Jackson
Cultural depictions of John F. Kennedy
Television series about personifications of death
Portrayals of Jesus on television
Television series by ShadowMachine
Television series by Williams Street
Television shows set in Europe
Works based on Frankenstein
2010s American time travel television series